Morris Arnovich (November 16, 1910 – July 20, 1959) nicknamed "Snooker", was an American baseball player. Arnovich played in Major League Baseball between 1936 and 1946 and played in the World Series winning team in 1940 as a part of the Cincinnati Reds. Playing as a line drive hitter, and fielding as an outfielder he began in the MLB for the Philadelphia Phillies in 1936 where he played four seasons before joining the Reds for a season. After his time in Cincinnati, he joined the New York Giants for the  season, and again for one game in  after joining the United States Army.

A member of the 1939 National League All-Star team, he finished his career with a .287 batting average. After retiring, Arnovich coached basketball and died in 1959 of a coronary occlusion.

Early and personal life

Arnovich was born in Superior, Wisconsin on November 16, 1910. One of the most religious Jewish major leaguers, Arnovich kept kosher his whole life. He attended Superior High School in Superior, Wisconsin. Arnovich was a two-time All-Wisconsin basketball star at the University of Wisconsin–Superior. He was later given the nickname "snooker", after being prolific in the British game of the same name.

Baseball career
Playing as a shortstop that year, he hit .331 and had a slugging percentage of .495 with 17 steals. Throughout the season he hit 14 home runs, putting him fourth in the league. His .918 fielding percentage was best of any shortstop with 50 or more games that season and made the unofficial All-Star team listed by the Spalding Guide.

The Phillies assigned him to the Hazleton Mountaineers of the New York–Pennsylvania League where he hit .305. In , he hit .327 with 19 home runs and 109 runs batted in (RBI) in the minor leagues. He also played his first games in Major League Baseball in 1936, debuting September 14, 1936, where he made .313 batting average over 13 games. He moved to the outfield, playing mostly in left field for the rest of his career. In , he hit .290 and had a career-high five double plays from the outfield, and made seven consecutive hits. In , he made the most outfield assists of his career – 18. He was referred to as the "Son of Israel", or the "Next Jewish Star" by the Anglo-Jewish press.

When Phil Weintraub entered the armed forces, Arnovich took his spot in the Phillies lineup. For the  season he was the top contact hitter in the National League before fading late and finishing fifth in the league with a .324 batting average, and sixth in the league with a .397 on base percentage. He also led all  left fielders in putouts, with 335, and in range factor/game, at 2.61.  He made the All-Star team in his best season, 18th in the MVP voting. Although originally not part of the team, a fan petition secured him a place on the roster, but he did not play.

At the age of 29, Arnovich was traded to the Cincinnati Reds for Johnny Rizzo in June  and had a disappointing season, though he continued to hit for solid contact (.284 with the Reds). He made his only World Series appearance that season, which Reds won 4–3 over the Detroit Tigers. He was sold to the New York Giants for $25,000 in December , and had a .280 batting average in 85 games through .

Arnovich tried to volunteer for the United States Army, but was turned down because he was missing a pair of molars. He got false teeth and volunteered again after Pearl Harbor in 1942; this time he was permitted in and spent the next four years in the Army. He was a staff sergeant for the Army in the Pacific Theater of Operations. While in the Army, Arnovich played for and managed the Fort Lewis baseball team, before becoming a postal clerk in New Guinea.

In 2010 he was ranked ninth in career batting average among Jewish major league baseball players of all-time.

Career statistics
In 590 games over seven seasons, Arnovich posted a .287 batting average (577-for-2013) with 234 runs, 104 doubles, 12 triples, 22 home runs, 261 RBIs, 17 stolen bases and 185 base on balls. He also had a .350 on-base percentage and .383 slugging percentage. Defensively, he recorded a .981 fielding percentage playing primarily at left field, but played several games at center and right field.

Later years and death
Arnovich coached basketball for a Catholic high school in Superior after retiring, then ran a jewelry store and a sporting goods store. He gave out free baseball lessons to teenagers in Superior, Arnovich would manage both the Davenport Cubs, and Selma Cloverleafs of the Cub's farm teams, and was a basketball coach at a local Catholic high school. He married Bertha Aserson on July 10, 1956, and ran a jewellery and sporting goods shop. On July 20, 1959, he died of a coronary occlusion at his home shortly after his third wedding anniversary. Arnovich was buried at the Hebrew Cemetery in Superior, Wisconsin.

See also
List of select Jewish baseball players

References

External links

1910 births
1959 deaths
American men's basketball players
Baseball players from Wisconsin
Cincinnati Reds players
Hazleton Mountaineers players
Jersey City Giants players
Jewish American baseball players
Jewish Major League Baseball players
Major League Baseball left fielders
National League All-Stars
New York Giants (NL) players
Philadelphia Phillies players
Sportspeople from Superior, Wisconsin
Superior Blues players
Wisconsin–Superior Yellowjackets baseball players
Wisconsin–Superior Yellowjackets men's basketball players
United States Army personnel of World War II
United States Army non-commissioned officers
20th-century American Jews